Ottman Dadoune (born 26 July 1994) is a French professional footballer who plays as a forward for  club Le Puy.

Personal life 
Born in France, Dadoune is of Algerian descent.

References

External links 
 
 

1994 births
Living people
Footballers from Nîmes
French sportspeople of Algerian descent
French footballers
Association football forwards
FC Bourgoin-Jallieu players
Louhans-Cuiseaux FC players
FC Chambly Oise players
FC Villefranche Beaujolais players
US Quevilly-Rouen Métropole players
Le Puy Foot 43 Auvergne players
Championnat National 3 players
Championnat National players
Ligue 2 players